Bali 2002 is an Australian-Indonesian historical drama television series. Developed by Screentime and Endemol Shine Australia for a co-commission between Stan and Nine Network, the four-part drama revolves around the 2002 Bali bombings. The series premiered on 25 September 2022.

Cast

Main

Supporting

Episodes

Production

Development
Bali 2002 is the first original series co-commission between Stan and 9Network. Peter Andrikidis and Katrina Irawati Graham are directing the series, and Kerrie Mainwaring of Screentime is producing. Executive producers include Tim Pye, Sara Richardson of Endemol Shine Australia, Michael Healy and Andy Ryan of 9Network, and Amanda Duthie and Cailah Scobie of Stan. Scobie stated the series had been developed by creatives in Australia and Indonesia "and in consultation with those directly impacted". Writers include Justin Monjo, Kris Wyld, Marcia Gardner, and Michael Toisuta with Ketut Yuliarsa as story editor.

Casting
The cast playing local Balinese as well as Australian and British tourists was announced alongside the series announcement, with, Rachel Griffiths, Richard Roxburgh, Claudia Jessie, Sean Keenan, Ewen Leslie set to star alongside Arka Das, Anthony Brandon Wong, Paul Ayre, Maleeka Gasbarri, Gerwin Widjaja, and Sri Ayu Jati Kartika.

Filming
Principal photography began at the beginning of March 2022 in Western Sydney where set replicas of Paddy's Pub and the Sari Club were constructed. Production is receiving support from Screen NSW.

Release
Banijay Rights are handling international distribution, which launched sales for the series at its 2022 London Screenings showcase.

References

External links
 (1)
 (2)

2020s Australian television miniseries
2022 Australian television series debuts
2022 Australian television series endings
English-language television shows
Indonesian-language television shows
Nine Network original programming
Stan (service) original programming
Television shows filmed in Australia
Television series based on actual events
Television series set in 2002
Television shows set in Indonesia
Television series by Endemol Australia
Television series by Screentime
2002 Bali bombings
Terrorism in television